Bettola (  or  ) is a comune (municipality) in the Province of Piacenza in the Italian region Emilia-Romagna, located about  west of Bologna and about  south of Piacenza.

People
France's last recognised World War I veteran, Lazare Ponticelli, was born here before moving to Paris at nine years of age.

The fraction of Pradello has been claimed as the official birthplace of Christopher Columbus. The leader of the Italian Democratic Party, Pier Luigi Bersani, was born here in 1951.

References

External links
 Official website 

Cities and towns in Emilia-Romagna